Mushrooms Demystified: A Comprehensive Guide to the Fleshy Fungi is a mushroom field and identification guide by American mycologist David Arora, published in 1979 and republished in 1986.

References 

1979 non-fiction books
Ten Speed Press books